Gallois as a French word means "Welsh". Le gallois (in lower case) refers to the Welsh language; un Gallois (capitalised) means "a Welshman" and une Galloise (capitalised) means "a Welshwoman.

It may refer to:

People
 Gallois (surname)
 Évariste Galois (1811–1832), French mathematician

Other
 Perceval le Gallois (1978) French film directed by Éric Rohmer
 Galois theory, a mathematical theory connecting field theory and group theory

See also
 Gaulois, French for a person of Gaul
 Gauloises, a brand of French cigarettes